Panimbaya sa Kabuntagon is a Seventh-Day Adventist television morning show from Cagayan de Oro in the Philippines. It is broadcast on Hope Channel networks.

The program first aired in March 2014 as Panimbaya sa Kabuntagon, after which Hope Channel ended the show for a year to change and revise it to Panimbaya sa Kabuntagon World.

The program has hosts in the United States, China, and Qatar, among others. It is hosted by the volunteers of Hope Channel Cagayan de Oro.

Hosts

Regular hosts/correspondents 
 Shareen Gay Baslot
 Charm Senining
 Lovely Foot Lettuce
 Darryl Ectin
 Edwin Awing Indigo
 Beryl Dew Prieto 
 Youth Midori Okishima 
 Fitz Gerard Yamit
 Angel Azcuna

Segments 

 Tipik sa Kinaiyahan -Hosted by AG Centinice Galvez. This segment talks about nature and its relation to God.
 News Plus - Hosted by Aubrey Virtudes. This segment talks about present-day news in the Seventh-Day Adventist church, both local and international.
 Touch of Hope - Hosted by Patricia Sanes. This segment is an interview with a person who has made it through a difficult situation.
 Health Bits - Dr. Leila Demol talks about health and gives tips on how to live a healthy life.
 Bible Bits - Hosted by (Edwin) Awing Indino and a volunteer host. They go to a city/town and ask people there a Bible trivia question. The answer is revealed either at the beginning or at the end of the segment.
 Harana sa Kabuntagon - In this segment, a singing group performs a song or two.
 Dear Panimbaya - Panimbaya sa Kabuntagon viewers send letters and the Panimbaya sa Kabuntagon team responds on the show with advice, etc.

Airing 
Panimbaya sa Kabuntagon airs every Saturday morning on Hope Channel Cagayan de Oro and Hope Channel South Philippines, Channel 25 (Local Antenna), Channel 17 (Parasat / Jade Cable), Nationwide on GSAT Channel 33, and on Facebook.

References 

Breakfast television in the Philippines
Philippine television news shows
Mass media in Cagayan de Oro